Mervyn Taylor (28 December 1931 – 23 September 2021) was an Irish Labour Party politician who served as Minister for Equality and Law Reform from 1993 to 1994 and from 1994 to 1997. He served as a Teachta Dála (TD) for the Dublin South-West constituency from 1981 to 1997. He was the first ever cabinet minister in Ireland who was Jewish.

Early life
Taylor was born to a Jewish family in Dublin. He was educated at Zion School in Rathgar, Wesley College, Dublin and Trinity College Dublin. He later qualified as a solicitor.

Legal practice
He worked for Herman Good Solicitors, alongside Herman Good and future district judge Hubert Wine. Good's involvement in the Labour Party was instrumental in Taylor getting involved in politics. Taylor later established his own firm of Taylor and Buchalter Solicitors with Don Buchalter, and practised as a solicitor for over 50 years before retiring from active practice in his 70s. He continued as a consultant to the firm of Taylor and Buchalter Solicitors for most of his 70s.

Politics
Taylor was elected to Dublin County Council in the 1970s, and became Chairman of the Council. He was elected to Dáil Éireann as a Labour Party Teachta Dála (TD) for Dublin South-West at the 1981 general election, on his third attempt. He then held the seat at every election until his retirement from politics in 1997.

He was Chairman of the Labour Party from 1987 to 1991, and Labour chief whip, from 1981 to 1988. He was assistant government chief whip from 1981 to 1982, and again from 1982 to 1987.

Taylor was a strong supporter of Israel, an unpopular cause in the Labour Party.

Minister for Equality and Law Reform
Taylor served two periods as Minister for Equality and Law Reform, in the 1993-94 Government under Taoiseach Albert Reynolds, and the 1994-97 Government under Taoiseach John Bruton.

1993–1994 Government
In January 1993, he was appointed to the newly created position of Minister for Equality and Law Reform in the Fianna Fáil–Labour coalition government led by Albert Reynolds as Taoiseach. 

Legislation introduced by Taylor and enacted during his initial term of office included the Interpretation (Amendment) Act 1993 – providing for gender inclusive language in Acts of the Oireachtas, the Jurisdiction of Courts and Enforcement of Judgments Act 1993, the Stillbirths Registration Act 1994, Maintenance Act 1994 and the Maternity Protection Act 1994 extending maternity rights.

1994–1997 Government
Labour resigned from government in November 1994, and from December 1994 it was part of a new coalition government of Fine Gael, Labour and Democratic Left formed without a new election, dubbed the Rainbow government, led by John Bruton as Taoiseach. Taylor was again appointed as Minister for Equality and Law Reform.

In 1995 Taylor was in charge of the government proposal to legislate to remove the prohibition of divorce from the constitution; he steered the relevant bills through Dáil Éireann and Seanad Éireann. The subsequent referendum was approved by a margin of 0.5 per cent. In the course of the campaign he survived criticism of the measure directed at his Jewish faith, as well as a Supreme Court ruling that public monies could not properly be spent in promoting the government's opinion on a referendum proposal.

Measures introduced by Taylor and enacted by the subsequent Dáil

Taylor also introduced two wide-ranging anti-discrimination measures: the Employment Equality Bill and the Equal Status Bill. These were struck down by the Supreme Court but revised versions were approved by the Government in the final months of Taylor's term of office, and were ultimately published and enacted during the following Dáil term.

Family and personal life
Taylor was married to Marilyn Taylor (née Fisher), who is the author of numerous books for young people. They had two sons, a daughter, and eight grandchildren. Their younger son, Gideon, is chief executive officer of  New York's Jewish Community Relations Council and of the Jewish Restitution Successor Organization and is adjunct professor of law at Fordham University in New York City.

Death and legacy
Taylor died on 23 September 2021, aged 89. Tributes to Taylor were led by President of Ireland, Michael D. Higgins, describing him as "one of the most gracious, unselfish and kindest members ever to serve in the Dáil". Stephen Collins, former political editor for The Irish Times, described him as "a rarity in politics, a quiet man who avoided any hint of flamboyance yet made a substantial impact on the State he served during an important time of social change".

A collection of Mervyn Taylor's papers from his time as the Minister for Equality and Law Reform is held at the National Library of Ireland.

References

 

1931 births
2021 deaths
Alumni of Trinity College Dublin
Councillors of Dublin County Council
Irish solicitors
Irish Zionists
Jewish Irish politicians
Labour Party (Ireland) TDs
Members of the 22nd Dáil
Members of the 23rd Dáil
Members of the 24th Dáil
Members of the 25th Dáil
Members of the 26th Dáil
Members of the 27th Dáil
People educated at Wesley College, Dublin
People from Templeogue
Politicians from County Dublin